HMS K6 was a British K class submarine built by HM Dockyard, Devonport. She was laid down on 8 November 1915 and commissioned in May 1917. K6 was the first of the K class to have its bows raised by converting it into a bulbous swan shape.

In 1917, K6 did not surface during a trial in North Dockyard, Devonport. K6 was involved in a serious exercise accident nicknamed the "Battle of May Island". She was responsible for ramming  and slicing her in half. She was sold on 13 July 1926 to John Cashmore Ltd for scrapping at Newport.

Design
K6 displaced  when at the surface and  while submerged. The submarine was powered by two oil-fired Yarrow Shipbuilders boilers supplying one geared Brown-Curtis or Parsons steam turbine; this developed 10,500 ship horsepower (7,800 kW) to drive two  screws. Submerged power came from four electric motors each producing . It was also had an  diesel engine to be used when steam was being raised, or instead of raising steam.

K6 was armed with ten  torpedo tubes, two  deck guns, and a  anti-aircraft gun. Its torpedo tubes were fitted to the bows, the midship section, and two were mounted on the deck. Its complement was fifty-nine crew members.

References

Bibliography

External links
 

 

British K-class submarines
Royal Navy ship names
1916 ships
Maritime incidents in 1918